On 24 June 1960 there was an assassination attempt against Venezuelan President Rómulo Betancourt, ordered by the Dominican dictator Rafael Leónidas Trujillo.

Background 
Betancourt had denounced the dictatorship of the Dominican Republic's Rafael Trujillo. In turn, Trujillo had developed an obsessive personal hatred of Betancourt and supported many plots by Venezuelan exiles to overthrow him. The Venezuelan government took its case against Trujillo to the Organization of American States, turning to diplomacy first over armed response to resolve the political conflict. This infuriated Trujillo, who ordered his foreign agents to assassinate Betancourt in Caracas.

Attempt 
After multiple failed attempts stopped by Trujillo's allies against his wishes. On 24 June 1960, an incendiary car bomb placed in a parked vehicle was detonated as Betancourt's presidential car drove by Paseo Los Próceres, one of the main avenues of Caracas. Betancourt was badly burned in the assassination attempt, the driver was severely injured and his head of security was killed.

Reactions 

The assassination attempt shocked the country. Betancourt walked out of the hospital in front of photographers, with both burned hands wrapped in bandages. Photos of a wounded but living Betancourt were distributed around the world as proof he survived. The incident elevated him in the eyes of the public opinion and helped to destroy one of his most stern Caribbean enemies at the same time.

See also 

 United Nations Security Council Resolution 156

1960 in Venezuela
History of Caracas
Betancourt
Rómulo Betancourt
Dominican Republic–Venezuela relations
State-sponsored terrorism
Rafael Trujillo